Joe McCormick was an actor, director, and presenter. He was accidentally shot while filming Whiplash.

Select credits
Tuesday at One (1957) - presenter
The Joe McCormick Show  (1959) - presenter
On the Beach (1959) - actor
One Bright Day (1959) - actor
The Adventures of the Terrible Ten (1960) - writer, director
Thunder on Sycamore Street (1960) - actor
Whiplash (1960–61) - actor, various episodes
Consider Your Verdict (1962) - actor
Time Out (1963) - actor
The Ten Again (1963) - director
Barley Charlie (1964) - actor
Adventures of the Seaspray (1965) - director
Funny Things Happen Down Under (1965) - director
The Magic Boomerang (1965–66) - director
Homicide (1966) - actor

References

External links
Joe McCormick at IMDb

Australian actors